"Cokane In My Brain" is a song written and performed by the Jamaican musician Dillinger. It was released as a single from his second studio album CB 200 in 1976 by Island Records. The song was produced by Joseph "Jo Jo" Hoo Kim, who used samples of People's Choice's "Do It Any Way You Wanna" and Enoch Light's "Hijack".

"Cokane in My Brain" is Dillinger's most successful single, reaching number one in the Netherlands, number two in Belgium and number 35 in Germany.

Track listing

Personnel 
 John Dent – mastering

Charts

Weekly charts

Year-end charts

See also 
 List of Dutch Top 40 number-one singles of 1977

References 

1976 singles
1976 songs
Dutch Top 40 number-one singles
Island Records singles
Reggae songs
Songs about cocaine